Kilembe is a community in Kasese District, in the Western Region of Uganda.

Location
The coordinates of Kilembe, Uganda are: 0°11'53.0"N, 30°00'49.0"E (Latitude:0.198059; Longitude:30.013620).

Overview
Kilembe is occupied by Kilembe Mines, the mining company pursuing the copper and cobalt in the rocks beneath and adjacent to the town. The town is also the location of a post office and Kilembe Mines Hospital.

Prominent people
 Leo Rwabwogo (1949 – 2009) – The late boxing champion was a native son
 Danny Faure (1962) – former President of Seychelles (2016-2020)
Sudhir Ruparelia

See also
 List of cities and towns in Uganda

References

Populated places in Western Region, Uganda
Kasese District